State Route 158 (SR 158) is a west-to-east highway in the city of Knoxville in the U.S. state of Tennessee.

Its western terminus is at Kingston Pike (U.S. Route 11 or US 11, US 70, and SR 1). Its eastern terminus is at Interstate 40 (I-40) at exit 388A. Portions of the highway are known as Neyland Drive and James White Parkway. The entire limited-access highway serves as a bypass of Downtown Knoxville and as a direct connector to the University of Tennessee (UT) campus and athletic facilities. Given its direct access to such facilities such as Neyland Stadium and Thompson-Boling Arena, SR 158 has been locally nicknamed "Game Day Highway."

Route description
SR 158 begins as a secondary highway known as Neyland Drive at an intersection with Kingston Pike (US 11/US 70/SR 1). It goes east as a 4-lane undivided highway to have an interchange with US 129/SR 115 (Alcoa Highway) before having a signalized intersection with Joe Johnson Drive (SR 450). Neyland Drive then travels along the northern banks of the Tennessee River and the southern edge of UT's campus, passing directly beside Thompson-Boling Arena, Neyland Stadium, and the university's engineering complex. It then runs along the southern edge of downtown, passing directly under the Henley Street Bridge and the Gay Street Bridge, before having an eastbound access-only exit for Volunteer Landing. SR 158 then makes a sharp turn to the north, leaving the riverbank, and has an T interchange with SR 71, James White Parkway, where Neyland Drive ends and SR 158 becomes signed as a primary highway as it takes over James White Parkway from SR 71. SR 158 then has westbound access-only interchanges with Main Street, Cumberland Avenue, and Summit Hill Drive before coming to an end at another T-interchange with I-40 at exit 388A.

History

Prior to the Cumberland Avenue Streetscape project, which ran from 2015-2017, the Neyland Drive portion of the highway was signed solely as secondary SR 158. Due to this project, TDOT relinquished control of Cumberland Avenue and the easternmost portion of Kingston Pike to the city of Knoxville and rerouted US 11/US 70/SR 1 onto SR 158 and Neyland Drive.

Major intersections

References

Tennessee Department of Transportation (24 January 2003). "State Highway and Interstate List 2003".

External links

Tennessee Department of Transportation

158
Transportation in Knox County, Tennessee
Transportation in Knoxville, Tennessee
Freeways in Tennessee